The healthcare error proliferation model is an adaptation of James Reason’s Swiss Cheese Model designed to illustrate the complexity inherent in the contemporary healthcare delivery system and the attribution of human error within these systems.  The healthcare error proliferation model explains the etiology of error and the sequence of events typically leading to adverse outcomes.  This model emphasizes the role organizational and external cultures contribute to error identification, prevention, mitigation, and defense construction.

Introduction 
Healthcare systems are complex in that they are diverse in both structure (e.g. nursing units, pharmacies, emergency departments, operating rooms) and professional mix (e.g. nurses, physicians, pharmacists, administrators, therapists) and made up of multiple interconnected elements with adaptive tendencies in that they have the capacity to change and learn from experience. The term complex adaptive systems (CAS) was coined at the interdisciplinary Santa Fe Institute (SFI), by John H. Holland, and Murray Gell-Mann.  Subsequently, scholars such as Ruth A. Anderson, Rubin McDaniels, and Paul Cilliers have extended CAS theory and research to the social sciences such as education and healthcare.

Model overview 
The healthcare error proliferation model (HEPM) adapts the Swiss Cheese Model to the complexity of healthcare delivery systems and integrated organizations.  The Swiss Cheese Model, likens the complex adaptive system to multiple hole infested slices of Swiss cheese positioned side-by-side.  The cheese slices are dubbed defensive layers to describe their role and function as the system location outfitted with features capable of intercepting and deflecting hazards. The layers represent discrete locations or organizational levels potentially populated with errors permitting error progression. The four layers include: 1) organizational leadership, 2) risky supervision, 3) situations for unsafe practices, and 4) unsafe performance.

The HEPM portrays hospitals as having multiple operational defensive layers outfitted with essential elements necessary to maintain key defensive barricades (Cook & O'Connor, 2005; Reason, 2000). By examining the defensive layers attributes, prospective locales of failure, the etiology of accidents might be revealed (Leape et al., 1995). Experts have discussed the importance of examining these layers within the context of the complex adaptive healthcare system (Kohn et al., 2000; Wiegmann & Shappell, 2003) and considering the psychological safety of clinicians.  Hence, this model expands Reason’s seminal work.

The model incorporates the complex adaptive healthcare system as a key characteristic.  Complex adaptive systems characteristically demonstrate self-organization as diverse agents interact spontaneously in nonlinear relationships  where professionals act as information processors (Cilliers, 1998; McDaniel & Driebe, 2001) and co-evolve with the environment (Casti, 1997). Healthcare professionals function in the system as diverse actors within the complex environment utilizing different methods to process information (Coleman, 1999) and solve systemic problems within and across organizational layers (McDaniel & Driebe, 2001).

Definitions 
A complex adaptive healthcare system (CAHS) is a care delivery enterprise with diverse clinical and administrative agents acting spontaneously, interacting in nonlinear networks where agents and patients are information processors, and actively co-evolve with their environment with the purposed to produce safe and reliable patient-centered outcomes.

See also

 Adverse effect (medicine)
 Adverse event
 Evidence-based medicine
 Hospital accreditation
 Iatrogenesis
 Iatrogenic disorder
 International healthcare accreditation
 Latent human error
 Medical error
 Nursing care
 Patient safety organization
 Peter Pronovost
 Root cause analysis
 Serious adverse event
 Swiss Cheese model of accident causation in human systems

Citations

References

Articles

 Anderson, R. A., Issel, M. L., & McDaniel, R. R. (2003). Nursing homes as complex adaptive systems: Relationship between management practice and resident outcomes. Nursing Research, 52(1): 12-21.
 Berta, W. B. & Baker, R. (2004). Factors that impact the transfer and retention of best practices for reducing error in hospitals. Health Care Management Review, 29(2): 90-97.
 Chiles, J. R. (2002). Inviting disaster: Lessons from the edge of technology. New York: HarperCollins Publishers.
 Coleman, H. J. (1999). What enables self-organizing behavior in business. Emergence, 1(1): 33-48.
 Cook, R. I., Render, M., & Woods, D. D. (2000). Gaps in the continuity of care and progress on patient safety. British Medical Journal, 320(7237): 791-794.
 Leape, L. L., Bates, D. W., Cullen, D. J., Cooper, J., Demonaco, H. J., Gallivan, T., R., H., Ives, J., Laird, N., Laffel, G., Nemeskal, R., Peterson, L. A., Porter, K., Servi, D., Shea, B. F., Small, S. D., Sweitzer, B. J., Thompson, B. T., & van der Vliet, M. (1995). Systems analysis of adverse drug events. ADE prevention study group. Journal of the American Medical Association, 274(1): 35-43.
 Leape, L. L. & Berwick, D. M. (2005). Five years after "To err is human": What have we learned?  Journal of the American Medical Association, 293(19): 2384-2390.
 Leduc, P. A., Rash, C. E., & Manning, M. S. (2005). Human factors in UAV accidents, Special Operations Technology, Online edition ed., Vol. 3.
 Leonard, M. L., Frankel, A., & Simmonds, T. (2004). Achieving safe and reliable healthcare: Strategies and solutions. Chicago: Health Administration Press.
 Rasmussen, J. (1990). The role of error in organizing behavior. Ergonomics, 33: 1185-1199.
 Rasmussen, J. (1999). The concept of human error: Is it useful for the design of safe systems in health care? In C. Vincent & B. deMoll (Eds.), Risk and safety in medicine: 31-47.  London: Elsevier.
 Reason, J. T. & Mycielska, K. (1982). Absent-minded? The psychology of mental lapses and everyday errors. Englewood Cliffs, NJ: Prentice-Hall Inc.
 Reason, J. T. (1990). Human error. New York: Cambridge University Press.
 Reason, J. T. (1997). Managing the risks of organizational accidents. Aldershot: Ashgate Publishing.
 Reason, J. T. (1998). Managing the risks of organizational accidents. Aldershot, England: Ashgate.
 Reason, J. T. (2000). Human error: Models and management. British Medical Journal, 320, 768-770.
 Reason, J. T., Carthey, J., & de Leval, M. R. (2001). Diagnosing vulnerable system syndrome: An essential prerequisite to effective risk management. Quality in Health Care, 10(S2): 21-25.
 Reason, J. T. & Hobbs, A. (2003). Managing maintenance error: A practical guide. Aldershot, England: Ashgate.
 Roberts, K. (1990). Some characteristics of one type of high reliability organization. Organization Science, 1(2): 160-176.
 Roberts, K. H. (2002). High reliability systems. Report on the institute of medicine committee on data standards for patient safety on September 23, 2003.

Books

Cilliers, P. (1998) Complexity and post modernism: Understanding complex systems. New York: Routledge. 

Other literature

Complexity theory

 Holland, J. H. (1992). Adaptation in natural and artificial systems.  Cambridge, MA: MIT Press. 
 Holland, J. H. (1995).  Hidden order: How adaptation builds complexity.  Reading, MA: Helix Books. 
 Holland, J. H. (1998).  Emergence: From chaos to order.  Reading, MA: Addison-Wesley. 
 Waldrop, M. M.  (1990).  Complexity: The emerging science at the edge of order and chaos.  New York: Simon & Schuster  

Error
Medical error
Medical terminology
Medical ethics
Evidence-based medicine